Brough is a surname. Notable people with the surname include:

Alan Brough (born 1967), New Zealand-born actor, television and radio host and comedian based in Australia
Albert Brough (1895–1972), British rugby league and association football player
Alexander Brough (1863–1940), New York politician
Andrew Brough, New Zealand musician
Antonia Brough (1897–1937), British actress
Arthur Brough (1905–1978), English actor
Barnabas Brough (–1854), British merchant, accountant and playwright
Bill Brough (born 1966), American politician
Charles Hillman Brough (1876–1935), American politician
Clayton Brough (born 1950), American climatologist and teacher
Danny Brough (born 1983), British rugby player and "Man of Steel" winner
George Brough (1890–1970), British motorcycle racer and manufacturer
Fanny Brough (1852–1914), British stage actress
Harry Brough (1896–1975), English footballer
Harvey Brough (born 1957), English musician
Jim Brough (1903–1986), British rugby and association football player
Joanne Brough (born 1927), American television producer and executive
Joel Brough (born 1968), Canadian field hockey player
Joseph Brough (1886–1968), English footballer
John Brough (disambiguation), several people
Jonathan Brough, New Zealand-born film director based in Australia
Jonathon Brough, New Zealand designer at special effects company Wētā Workshop
Lionel Brough (1836–1909), British actor and comedian
Louise Brough (1923–2014), American tennis player
Mal Brough (born 1961), Australian politician
Mary Brough (1863–1934), English actress
Michael Brough (footballer) (born 1981), English footballer
Michael Brough (game designer) (born 1985), New Zealand video game developer
Mick Brough (1899–1960), New Zealand rower
Patrick Brough (born 1996), English footballer
Paul Brough (conductor) (born 1963), English conductor
Paul Brough (footballer) (born 1965), English professional footballer
Peter Brough (1916–1999), English radio ventriloquist
Robert Barnabas Brough (1828–1860), English poet, novelist and playwright
Robert Brough (1872–1905), Scottish painter
Rob Brough (born 1955), Australian journalist, television presenter and rugby league coach
William Brough (disambiguation), several people
Zara Cisco Brough (1919–1988), Native American chief

See also
 Jonathan Brugh, New Zealand actor and comedian